Athanase Sartori (10 May 1852 – 9 October 1920) was a French sports shooter. He competed in three events at the 1912 Summer Olympics.

References

1852 births
1920 deaths
French male sport shooters
Olympic shooters of France
Shooters at the 1912 Summer Olympics
Sportspeople from Varese